Stadion Lachen is a multi-use stadium in Thun, Switzerland.  It is currently used mostly for American Football matches of the Thun Tigers. The stadium was the home ground of FC Thun from 1954 until 2011.  The stadium holds 10,350 and was built in 1954. The stadium has areas for both sitting and standing.

The Thun Tigers play home matches at the Stadium since 2012 in the Nationalliga A (American football) the top-level league for American football in Switzerland.

Lachen
Sports venues in the Canton of Bern
Sports venues completed in 1954
1954 establishments in Switzerland
FC Thun
20th-century architecture in Switzerland